New Viruthakirikuppam is a village. it is also called as puthu viruthakirikuppam in Tamil. It is in Virudhachalam taluk near Neyveli in Cuddalore district, Tamil Nadu state in southern India. It is fifteen kilometers far from Virudhachalam. Mudhanai is five kilometer far from new viruthakirikuppam. It is in between Etakuppam and Pazhaya Viruthakirikuppam. There is a government middle school and a church dedicated to Our Lady of Good Health(called arokia annai alayam in Tamil language). The church is under the parish of Iruppukuricy of the Roman Catholic Archdiocese of Pondicherry and Cuddalore. There are two hundred Hindu families, about seventy Christian families and six families of barbars.

Demographics

Around eight hundred people live in this village. Many of them are Hindus. Around hundred and fifty people are Christians. Around fifty people are barbers.

Geology
The soil in New Viruthakirikuppam is good for all kinds of agricultural works. The main basis of the local economy is agriculture, including sugar cane, ground nuts, green grain and other crops. people cultivate groundnuts a lot in this areas. people also cultivate cashew nuts, mango and jack fruit.

Churches and temples

There are three temples and a church in the village.

Festival

The village is known for its festival of Our Lady of Good Health. This occurs in May and around six lakhs (600,000) of people gather for the feast. Hindu participants are more than the Christians. two-thirds of the devotees are Hindus.

Car procession is very famous in the festival. the car is about sixty-feet tall. Around two hundred devotees carry the well-decorated car. it starts about 10.30 p.m on 13 May. there are three cars in procession. the first one is for archangel, Michael; the second one is for st. Joseph, the worker and the third one is for the patroness of the village, our lady of good health. the first one is small in size; the second one is medium in size and the third one is very tall and broad in size. all the three cars are carried by the people. it shows of their unity and co-operation in celebrating the festival. though there are only hundred and fifty Christians in this village, great things happen because of their unity and the help of the parish and neighboring village people. the cars go through the Christian streets for more than three hours. The Hindu people take main part in the car procession. The car is prepared by the usual agents and they take three or four days to make it.

Villages in Cuddalore district